ORLS may refer to:

Ocmulgee Regional Library System
Oconee Regional Library System
Our Redeemer Lutheran School in Madison, Wisconsin